The Bora are an indigenous tribe of the Peruvian, Colombian, and Brazilian Amazon, located between the Putumayo and Napo rivers.

Ethnography
The Bora speak a Witotan language and comprise approximately 2,000 people.

In the last forty years, the Bora have become a largely settled people living mostly in permanent forest settlements.

The animist Bora worldview makes no distinction between the physical and spiritual worlds, and spirits are considered to be present throughout the world.

Bora families practice exogamy.

The Bora have an elaborate knowledge of the plant life of the surrounding rainforest. Like other indigenous peoples of the Peruvian Amazon, such as the Urarina, plants, especially trees, hold a complex and important interest for the Bora.

Bows and arrows are the main weapons of the Bora culture used in person to person conflict.

The Bora have guarded their lands from both indigenous foes and outsider colonials. Around the time of the 20th century, the rubber boom had a devastating impact on the Boras, who suffered mistreatment during that time period.

The Bora tribe's ancestral lands are currently threatened by illegal logging practices. The Bora have no indigenous reserves.

References

Bibliography
 Harrison, Theresa;  Media, Demand (n.d.). Basic Beliefs of the Bora Indians. Classroom Synonym. Retrieved on 2015-02-01 from http://classroom.synonym.com/basic-beliefs-bora-indians-6514.html.

External links
 The Bora People
 

Indigenous peoples of the Amazon
Indigenous peoples in Brazil
Indigenous peoples in Colombia
Indigenous peoples in Peru